Terrance Bullitt (born August 5, 1991) is an American football linebacker who is currently a free agent. Bullitt played at the college level for Texas Tech.

Early years
Bullitt played at the safety position at Naaman Forest High School in Garland, Texas. Bullitt earned All-District 10-5A 1st team honors and was rated a 3-star prospect by Rivals.com coming out of high school.

College career

Bullitt played at the college level for Texas Tech where he redshirted his freshman season in 2009. In his redshirt freshman season in 2010, Bullitt played in all 12 games and finished the season with 23 tackles at the safety position.

In 2011, Bullitt was named a preseason All-Big 12 Conference 2nd Team selection by College Football News. Bullitt started in all 12 games and tallied 56 tackles, 9.5 tackles for loss, and 4 pass breakups. Bullitt's performance garnered All-Big 12 Conference honorable mention honors, as well as a 2nd Team selection from the Dallas Morning News''. Throughout the season, Bullitt was battling a nagging shoulder injury that required surgery during the offseason.

Bullitt's junior season in 2012 saw him in action in 10 games with 7 starts before sidelined for the final three games by another shoulder injury. Bullitt would tally 19 tackles, 2 tackles for loss, and one sack.

During his senior season in 2013, Bullitt would play in all 13 games with 12 starts at the linebacker position. He would tally 37 tackles, 3 tackles for loss, two sacks, 9 pass breakups and two recovered fumbles.

Professional career

Bullitt would go undrafted in the 2014 NFL Draft before being signed as a free agent to the Baltimore Ravens.

In 2018, he signed with the Arizona Hotshots of the AAF for the 2019 season, but was waived during final roster cuts on January 30, 2019.

References

Living people
1991 births
Players of American football from Texas
African-American players of American football
African-American players of Canadian football
American football linebackers
American football safeties
Canadian football linebackers
People from Garland, Texas
Texas Tech Red Raiders football players
Baltimore Ravens players
Hudson Valley Fort players
Edmonton Elks players
Arizona Hotshots players
21st-century African-American sportspeople